RES-1 radar is a mobile radar designed to provide precise position data of medium & low altitude aircraft, which is mainly used in the air defense, coastal defense or battlefield air defense.

It is manufactured and exported by the Nanjing Changjiang Machinery Group Co Ltd.

External links
 Nanjing Changjiang Machinery Group Co Ltd 

Ground radars
Military radars of the People's Republic of China